Penny Layden (born 1969) is a British actress and narrator. She has performed at the National Theatre, with the Royal Shakespeare Company, the Old Vic Theatre, with Shared Experience and the Royal Exchange Theatre.

Her television credits include Call the Midwife, Silent Witness, Poppy Shakespeare and EastEnders; she also performed in The Libertine starring Johnny Depp.

Film

Television

References

1969 births
Living people
British stage actresses
British television actresses